John Wycliffe (also spelled Wyclif, Wickliffe, and other variants;  1328 – 31 December 1384) was an English scholastic philosopher, theologian, biblical translator, reformer, Catholic priest, and a seminary professor at the University of Oxford. He became an influential dissident within the Catholic priesthood during the 14th century and is considered an important predecessor to Protestantism. Wycliffe questioned the privileged status of the clergy, who had bolstered their powerful role in England, and the luxury and pomp of local parishes and their ceremonies.

Wycliffe advocated translation of the Bible into the common vernacular. According to tradition, Wycliffe is said to have completed a translation direct from the Vulgate into Middle English – a version now known as Wycliffe's Bible. While it is probable that he personally translated the Gospels of Matthew, Mark, Luke, and John, it is possible he translated the entire New Testament. At any rate, it is assumed that his associates translated the Old Testament. Wycliffe's Bible appears to have been completed prior to 1384 with additional updated versions being done by Wycliffe's assistant John Purvey, and others, in 1388 and 1395. More recently, historians of the Wycliffite movement have suggested that Wycliffe had at most, a minor role in the actual translations.

Wycliffe's later followers, derogatorily called Lollards by their orthodox contemporaries in the 15th and 16th centuries, adopted many of the beliefs attributed to Wycliffe such as theological virtues, predestination, iconoclasm, and the notion of caesaropapism, while questioning the veneration of saints, the sacraments, requiem masses, transubstantiation, monasticism, and the legitimacy of the Papacy. Like the Waldensians, Hussites and Friends of God, the Lollard movement in some ways anticipated the Protestant Reformation.

Wycliffe's writings in Latin greatly influenced the philosophy and teaching of the Czech reformer Jan Hus ( 1369–1415), whose execution in 1415 sparked a revolt and led to the Hussite Wars of 1419–1434.

 Life and career 

 Early life 

Wycliffe was born in the village of Hipswell near Richmond in the North Riding of Yorkshire, England, around the 1320s. He has conventionally been given a birth date of 1324 but Hudson and Kenny state only records "suggest he was born in the mid-1320s". Conti states that he was born "before 1331
". His family was long settled in Yorkshire. The family was quite large, covering considerable territory, principally centred on Wycliffe-on-Tees, about ten miles to the north of Hipswell.

Wycliffe received his early education close to his home. It is unknown when he first came to Oxford, with which he was so closely connected until the end of his life, but he is known to have been at Oxford around 1345. Thomas Bradwardine was the Archbishop of Canterbury, and his book On the Cause of God against the Pelagians, a bold recovery of the Pauline-Augustine doctrine of grace, would greatly shape young Wycliffe's views, as did the Black Death which reached England in the summer of 1348. From his frequent references to it in later life, it appears to have made a deep and abiding impression upon him. According to Robert Vaughn, the effect was to give Wycliffe "Very gloomy views in regard to the condition and prospects of the human race." Wycliffe would have been at Oxford during the St Scholastica Day riot in which sixty-three students and a number of townspeople were killed.

 Career in education 

Wycliffe completed his arts degree at Merton College as a junior fellow in 1356. That same year he produced a small treatise, The Last Age of the Church. In the light of the virulence of the plague that had subsided seven years previously, Wycliffe's studies led him to the opinion that the close of the 14th century would mark the end of the world. While other writers viewed the plague as God's judgment on sinful people, Wycliffe saw it as an indictment of an unworthy clergy. The mortality rate among the clergy had been particularly high, and those who replaced them were, in his opinion, uneducated or generally disreputable.

He was Master of Balliol College in 1361. In this same year, he was presented by the college to the parish of Fillingham in Lincolnshire, which he visited rarely during long vacations from Oxford. For this he had to give up the headship of Balliol College, though he could continue to live at Oxford. He is said to have had rooms in the buildings of The Queen's College. In 1362 he was granted a prebend at Aust in Westbury-on-Trym, which he held in addition to the post at Fillingham.

His performance led Simon Islip, Archbishop of Canterbury, to place him in 1365 at the head of Canterbury Hall, where twelve young men were preparing for the priesthood. In December 1365 Islip appointed Wycliffe as warden but when Islip died the following year his successor, Simon Langham, a man of monastic training, turned the leadership of the college over to a monk. In 1367 Wycliffe appealed to Rome. In 1371 Wycliffe's appeal was decided and the outcome was unfavourable to him. The incident was typical of the ongoing rivalry between monks and secular clergy at Oxford at this time.

In 1368, he gave up his living at Fillingham and took over the rectory of Ludgershall, Buckinghamshire, not far from Oxford, which enabled him to retain his connection with the university. Tradition has it that he commenced his translation of the Bible into English whilst sitting in a room above what is now the porch in Ludgershall Church. In 1369 Wycliffe obtained a bachelor's degree in theology, and his doctorate in 1372.  In 1374, he received the crown living of St Mary's Church, Lutterworth in Leicestershire, which he retained until his death.

 Politics 

In 1374 his name appears second, after a bishop, on a commission which the English Government sent to Bruges to discuss with the representatives of Gregory XI a number of points in dispute between the king and the pope. He was no longer satisfied with his chair as the means of propagating his ideas, and soon after his return from Bruges he began to express them in tracts and longer works. In a book concerned with the government of God and the Ten Commandments, he attacked the temporal rule of the clergy, the collection of annates, indulgences, and simony.

He entered the politics of the day with his great work De civili dominio ("On Civil Dominion"), which drew arguments from the works of Richard FitzRalph's. This called for the royal divestment of all church property. His ideas on lordship and church wealth caused his first official condemnation in 1377 by Pope Gregory XI, who censured 19 articles. Wycliffe argued that the Church had fallen into sin and that it ought therefore to give up all its property and that the clergy should live in complete poverty. The tendency of the high offices of state to be held by clerics was resented by many of the nobles, such as the backroom power broker John of Gaunt, who would have had his own reasons for opposing the wealth and power of the clergy, since it challenged the foundation of his power.

Conflict with the Church

Wycliffe was summoned before William Courtenay, Bishop of London, on 19 February 1377. The exact charges are not known, as the matter did not get as far as a definite examination. Lechler suggests that Wycliffe was targeted by John of Gaunt's opponents among the nobles and church hierarchy. Gaunt, the Earl Marshal Henry Percy, and a number of other supporters accompanied Wycliffe. A crowd gathered at the church, and at the entrance, party animosities began to show, especially in an angry exchange between the bishop and Wycliffe's protectors. Gaunt declared that he would humble the pride of the English clergy and their partisans, hinting at the intent to secularise the possessions of the Church. The assembly broke up and Gaunt and his partisans departed with their protégé.

Most of the English clergy were irritated by this encounter, and attacks upon Wycliffe began. The second and third books of his work dealing with civil government carry a sharp polemic. On 22 May 1377 Pope Gregory XI sent five copies of a bull against Wycliffe, dispatching one to the Archbishop of Canterbury, and the others to the Bishop of London, King Edward III, the Chancellor, and the university; among the enclosures were 18 theses of his, which were denounced as erroneous and dangerous to Church and State. Stephen Lahey suggests that Gregory's action against Wycliffe was an attempt to put pressure on King Edward to make peace with France. Edward III died on 21 June 1377, and the bull against Wycliffe did not reach England before December. Wycliffe was asked to give the king's council his opinion on whether it was lawful to withhold traditional payments to Rome, and he responded that it was.

Back at Oxford the Vice-Chancellor confined Wycliffe for some time in Black Hall, but his friends soon obtained his release. In March 1378, he was summoned to appear at Lambeth Palace to defend himself. However, Sir Lewis Clifford entered the chapel and in the name of the queen mother (Joan of Kent), forbade the bishops to proceed to a definite sentence concerning Wycliffe's conduct or opinions. The bishops, who were divided, satisfied themselves with forbidding him to speak further on the controversy. Wycliffe then wrote his De incarcerandis fedelibus, in which he demanded that it should be legal for the excommunicated to appeal to the king and his council against the excommunication; in this writing he laid open the entire case, in such a way that it was understood by the laity. He wrote his 33 conclusions in Latin and English. The masses, some of the nobility, and his former protector, John of Gaunt, rallied to him. Before any further steps could be taken at Rome, Gregory XI died in 1378.

The attacks on Pope Gregory XI grew ever more extreme. Wycliffe's stand concerning the ideal of poverty became continually firmer, as well as his position with regard to the temporal rule of the clergy. Closely related to this attitude was his book De officio regis, the content of which was foreshadowed in his 33 conclusions. This book, like those that preceded and followed, was concerned with the reform of the Church, in which the temporal arm was to have an influential part.

From 1380 onwards, Wycliffe devoted himself to writings that argued his rejection of transubstantiation, and strongly criticised the friars who supported it.

 Anti-Wycliffe synod 

In the summer of 1381 Wycliffe formulated his doctrine of the Lord's Supper in twelve short sentences, and made it a duty to advocate it everywhere. Then the English hierarchy proceeded against him. The chancellor of the University of Oxford had some of the declarations pronounced heretical. When this was announced to Wycliffe, he declared that no one could change his convictions. He then appealed – not to the pope nor to the ecclesiastical authorities of the land, but to the king. He published his great confession upon the subject and also a second writing in English intended for the common people.

As long as Wycliffe limited his attacks to abuses and the wealth of the Church, he could rely on the support of part of the clergy and aristocracy, but once he dismissed the traditional doctrine of transubstantiation, his theses could not be defended any more. This view cost him the support of John of Gaunt and many others.

In the midst of this came the Peasants' Revolt of 1381. The revolt was sparked in part by Wycliffe's preaching carried throughout the realm by "poor priests" appointed by Wycliffe (mostly laymen). The preachers didn't limit their criticism of the accumulation of wealth and property to that of the monasteries, but rather included secular properties belonging to the nobility as well. Although Wycliffe disapproved of the revolt, some of his disciples justified the killing of Simon Sudbury, Archbishop of Canterbury. In 1382 Wycliffe's old enemy William Courtenay, now Archbishop of Canterbury, called an ecclesiastical assembly of notables at London. During the consultations on 21 May an earthquake occurred; the participants were terrified and wished to break up the assembly, but Courtenay declared the earthquake a favourable sign which meant the purification of the earth from erroneous doctrine, and the result of the "Earthquake Synod" was assured.

Of the 24 propositions attributed to Wycliffe without mentioning his name, ten were declared heretical and fourteen erroneous. The former had reference to the transformation in the sacrament, the latter to matters of church order and institutions. It was forbidden from that time to hold these opinions or to advance them in sermons or in academic discussions. All persons disregarding this order were to be subject to prosecution. To accomplish this the help of the State was necessary; but the Commons rejected the bill. The king, however, had a decree issued which permitted the arrest of those in error.

The citadel of the reformatory movement was Oxford, where Wycliffe's most active helpers were; these were laid under the ban and summoned to recant, and Nicholas of Hereford went to Rome to appeal.

On 17 November 1382, Wycliffe was summoned before a synod at Oxford. He still commanded the favour of the court and of Parliament, to which he addressed a memorial. He was neither excommunicated then, nor deprived of his living.

Wycliffe aimed to do away with the existing hierarchy and replace it with the "poor priests" who lived in poverty, were bound by no vows, had received no formal consecration, and preached the Gospel to the people. Itinerant preachers spread the teachings of Wycliffe. The bull of Gregory XI impressed upon them the name of Lollards, intended as an opprobrious epithet, but it became, to them, a name of honour. Even in Wycliffe's time the "Lollards" had reached wide circles in England and preached "God's law, without which no one could be justified."

 Death and posthumous declaration of heresy 

In the years before his death in 1384 he increasingly argued for Scriptures as the authoritative centre of Christianity, that the claims of the papacy were unhistorical, that monasticism was irredeemably corrupt, and that the moral unworthiness of priests invalidated their office and sacraments.

Wycliffe returned to Lutterworth, and sent out tracts against the monks and Urban VI, since the latter, contrary to Wycliffe's hopes, had not turned out to be a reforming pope. The literary achievements of Wycliffe's last days, such as the Trialogus, stand at the peak of the knowledge of his day. His last work, the Opus evangelicum, the last part of which he named in characteristic fashion "Of Antichrist", remained uncompleted. While he was saying Mass in the parish church on Holy Innocents' Day, 28 December 1384, he suffered a stroke, and died a few days later.

The Anti-Wycliffite Statute of 1401 extended persecution to Wycliffe's remaining followers. The "Constitutions of Oxford" of 1408 aimed to reclaim authority in all ecclesiastical matters, and specifically named John Wycliffe as it banned certain writings, and noted that translation of Scripture into English by unlicensed laity was a crime punishable by charges of heresy.

The Council of Constance declared Wycliffe a heretic on 4 May 1415, and banned his writings, effectively both excommunicating him retroactively and making him an early forerunner of Protestantism. The Council decreed that Wycliffe's works should be burned and his bodily remains removed from consecrated ground. This order, confirmed by Pope Martin V, was carried out in 1428. Wycliffe's corpse was exhumed and burned and the ashes cast into the River Swift, which flows through Lutterworth.

None of Wycliffe's contemporaries left a complete picture of his person, his life, and his activities. Paintings representing Wycliffe are from a later period. In The Testimony of William Thorpe (1407), Wycliffe appears wasted and physically weak. Thorpe says Wycliffe was of unblemished walk in life, and regarded affectionately by people of rank, who often consorted with him, took down his sayings, and clung to him. "I indeed clove to none closer than to him, the wisest and most blessed of all men whom I have ever found."

Thomas Netter highly esteemed John Kynyngham in that he "so bravely offered himself to the biting speech of the heretic and to words that stung as being without the religion of Christ". But this example of Netter is not well chosen, since the tone of Wycliffe toward Kynyngham is that of a junior toward an elder whom one respects, and he handled other opponents in similar fashion.

 Works 

In keeping with Wycliffe's belief that scripture was the only authoritative reliable guide to the truth about God, he became involved in efforts to translate the Bible into English. While Wycliffe is credited, it is not possible exactly to define his part in the translation, which was based on the Vulgate. There is no doubt that it was his initiative, and that the success of the project was due to his leadership. From him comes the translation of the New Testament, which was smoother, clearer, and more readable than the rendering of the Old Testament by his friend Nicholas of Hereford. The whole was revised by Wycliffe's younger contemporary John Purvey in 1388.

There still exist about 150 manuscripts, complete or partial, containing the translation in its revised form. From this, one may easily infer how widely diffused it was in the 15th century. For this reason the Wycliffites in England were often designated by their opponents as "Bible men".

Wycliffe's other works include:

 The Last Age of the Church (1356)
 De Logica ("On Logic") 1360
 De Universalibus ("On Universals") 1368
 De Dominio Divino (1373)
 De Mandatis Divinis (1375)
 De Statu Innocencie (1376)
 De Civili Dominio (1377)
 Responsio (1377)
 De Ecclesia ("On the Church") 1379
 De veritate sacrae scripturae (On the Truthfulness of Holy Scripture) 1378
 On the Pastoral Office 1378
 De apostasia ("On Apostasy") 1379
 De Eucharistia (On the Eucharist") 1379
 Objections to Friars (1380)
 The last age of the pope (1381)

 Doctrines 

Wycliffe had come to regard the scriptures as the only reliable guide to the truth about God, and maintained that all Christians should rely on the Bible rather than on the teachings of popes and clerics. He said that there was no scriptural justification for the papacy.

Theologically, his preaching expressed a strong belief in predestination that enabled him to declare an "invisible church of the elect", made up of those predestined to be saved, rather than in the "visible" Catholic Church.
To Wycliffe, the Church was the totality of those who are predestined to blessedness. No one who is eternally lost has part in it. There is one universal Church, and outside of it there is no salvation.

His first tracts and greater works of ecclesiastical-political content defended the privileges of the State. By 1379 in his De ecclesia ("On the Church"), Wycliffe clearly claimed the supremacy of the king over the priesthood. He also rejected the selling of indulgences.

So far as his polemics accord with those of earlier antagonists of the papacy, it is fair to assume that he was not ignorant of them and was influenced by them. It was Wycliffe who recognised and formulated one of the two major formal principles of the Reformation – the unique authority of the Bible for the belief and life of the Christian.

 Attack on monasticism 
The battle against what he saw as an imperialised papacy and its supporters, the "sects", as he called the monastic orders, takes up a large space not only in his later works, such as the Trialogus, Dialogus, Opus evangelicum, and in his sermons, but also in a series of sharp tracts and polemical productions in Latin and English (of which those issued in his later years have been collected as "Polemical Writings").

In the 1380 Objections to Friars, he calls monks the pests of society, enemies of religion, and patrons and promoters of every crime. He directed his strongest criticism against the friars, whose preaching he considered neither scriptural nor sincere, but motivated by "temporal gain". While others were content to seek the reform of particular errors and abuses, Wycliffe sought nothing less than the extinction of the institution itself, as being repugnant to scripture, and inconsistent with the order and prosperity of the Church. He advocated the dissolution of the monasteries.

 Views on the papacy 
Rudolph Buddensieg finds two distinct aspects in Wycliffe's work. The first, from 1366 to 1378, reflects a political struggle with Rome, while 1378 to 1384 is more a religious struggle. In each Wycliffe has two approaches: he attacks both the Papacy and its institutions, and also Roman Catholic doctrine.

Wycliffe's influence was never greater than at the moment when pope and antipope sent their ambassadors to England to gain recognition for themselves. In 1378, in the ambassadors' presence, he delivered an opinion before Parliament that showed, in an important ecclesiastical political question (the matter of the right of asylum in Westminster Abbey), a position that was to the liking of the State. He argued that criminals who had taken sanctuary in churches might lawfully be dragged out of sanctuary.

The books and tracts of Wycliffe's last six years include continual attacks upon the papacy and the entire hierarchy of his times. Each year they focus more and more, and at the last, the pope and the Antichrist seem to him practically equivalent concepts. Yet there are passages which are moderate in tone: G. V. Lechler identifies three stages in Wycliffe's relations with the papacy. The first step, which carried him to the outbreak of the schism, involves moderate recognition of the papal primacy; the second, which carried him to 1381, is marked by an estrangement from the papacy; and the third shows him in sharp contest.

 Basic positions in philosophy 
Wycliffe was a prominent English theologian and scholastic philosopher of the second half of the 14th century. He earned his great repute as a philosopher at an early date. Henry Knighton says that in philosophy he was second to none, and in scholastic discipline incomparable. There was a period in his life when he devoted himself exclusively to scholastic philosophy. His first book, De Logica (1360), explores the fundamentals of Scholastic Theology. He believed that "one should study Logic in order to better understand the human mind because ...human thoughts, feelings and actions bear God's image and likeness".

The centre of Wycliffe's philosophical system is formed by the doctrine of the prior existence in the thought of God of all things and events. While Platonic realism would view "beauty' as a property that exists in an ideal form independently of any mind or thing, "for Wycliffe every universal, as part of creation, derived its existence from God, the Creator". Wycliffe was a close follower of Augustine, and always upheld the primacy of the Creator over the created reality.
 
A second key point of Wycliffe's is his emphasis on the notion of divine Lordship, explored in De dominio Divino (c. 1373), which examines the relationship between God and his creatures. The practical application of this for Wycliffe was seen in the rebellious attitude of individuals (particulars) towards rightful authority (universals). In De civili dominio he discusses the appropriate circumstance under which an entity may be seen as possessing authority over lesser subjects. Dominium is always conferred by God. "Beyond all doubt, intellectual and emotional error about universals is the cause of all sin that reigns in the world." In some of his teachings, as in De annihilatione, the influence of Thomas Aquinas can be detected.

He said that Democritus, Plato, Augustine, and Grosseteste far outranked Aristotle. So far as his relations to the philosophers of the Middle Ages are concerned, he held to realism as opposed to the nominalism advanced by William of Ockham.

A number of Wycliffe's ideas have been carried forward in the twentieth century by philosopher and Reformed theologian Cornelius Van Til.

 Attitude toward speculation 
Wycliffe's fundamental principle of the preexistence in thought of all reality involves the most serious obstacle to freedom of the will; the philosopher could assist himself only by the formula that the free will of man was something predetermined of God. He demanded strict dialectical training as the means of distinguishing the true from the false, and asserted that logic (or the syllogism) furthered the knowledge of catholic verities; ignorance of logic was the reason why men misunderstood Scripture, since men overlooked the connection, the distinction between idea and appearance.

Wycliffe was not merely conscious of the distinction between theology and philosophy, but his sense of reality led him to pass by scholastic questions. He left aside philosophical discussions that seemed to have no significance for the religious consciousness and those that pertained purely to scholasticism: "We concern ourselves with the verities that are, and leave aside the errors which arise from speculation on matters which are not."

 Sacraments 
John Wycliffe rejected transubstantiation along with the sacrament of confession, saying it was against scripture. Wycliffe was attacked as being a Donatist, however the claim was a misconception, perhaps used to discredit his views on the Eucharist.

 Soteriology 
Wycliffe appears to have had similar ideas of justification as the later reformers would. According to Wycliffe faith was sufficient for salvation:

Trust wholly in Christ; rely altogether on his sufferings; beware of seeking to be justified in any other way than by his righteousness. Faith in our Lord Jesus Christ is sufficient for salvation.
— John Wycliffe

 Legacy 

Wycliffe was instrumental in the development of a translation of the Bible in English, thus making it accessible to laypeople. He also had a strong influence on Jan Hus. Several institutions are named after him:

 Wycliffe Global Alliance, an alliance of organisations with the common objective of translating the Bible for every language group that needs it.
 Wycliffe Hall, Oxford, one of the Church of England's designated Evangelical theological colleges.
 Wycliffe College, Toronto, a graduate theological school federated with the University of Toronto.
 Wycliffe College, Gloucestershire, an English independent, private day and boarding school.

Wycliffe is honoured with a commemoration in the Church of England on 31 December, and in the Anglican Church of Canada.

 See also 

 John Bankin
 Ecclesiae Regimen
 General Prologue of the Wycliffe Bible
 Lollardy
 William Tyndale

 Citations 

 General and cited sources 
 
 

 Further reading 
 Boreczky, Elemér. John Wyclif's Discourse on Dominion in Community (Leiden, Brill, 2007) (Studies in the History of Christian Traditions 139).
 Fountain, David. John Wycliffe – The Dawn Of The Reformation (Mayflower Christian Publications, 1984) .
 Hudson, Anne, and Anthony Kenny. "Wyclif , John (d. 1384)", Oxford Dictionary of National Biography, Oxford University Press, 2004; online ed., September 2010 accessed 13 October 2014 ; a short biography 
 Ghosh, Kantik. The Wycliffite Heresy. Authority and the Interpretation of Texts (Cambridge, Cambridge University Press, 2001) (Cambridge Studies in Medieval Literature, 45).
 Lahey, Stephen E. John Wyclif (Oxford University Press, 2009) (Great Medieval Thinkers).
 Lahey, Stephen E. "John Wyclif." in Encyclopedia of Medieval Philosophy (Springer Netherlands, 2011) pp. 653–58.
 G. W. H. Lampe, ed. The Cambridge History of the Bible. The West from the Fathers to the Reformation, [Vol 2] 
 Leff, Gordon. John Wyclif: The Path the Dissent (Oxford University Press, 1966)
 Levy, Ian C., ed. A Companion to John Wyclif, Late Medieval Theologian. Brill's Companions to the Christian Tradition 4). Leiden: Brill, 2006. (hardcover, .)
 McFarlane, K. B.  The origins of religious dissent in England (New York, Collier Books, 1966) (Originally published under the title "John Wycliffe and the beginnings of English nonconformity", 1952).
 Michael, Emily (2003). "John Wyclif on body and mind". Journal of the History of Ideas. 64#3 pp. 343–60.
 Robson, John Adam. Wyclif and the Oxford Schools:  The Relation of the "Summa de Ente" to Scholastic Debates at Oxford in the Later Fourteenth Century (Cambridge, England:  Cambridge University Press, 1961).
 Thakkar, Mark. Duces caecorum: On Two Recent Translations of Wyclif (Vivarium, 2020)

 External links 

 
 BBC radio 4 discussion from In Our Time''. "John Wyclif and the Lollards". (45 mins)
 
 
 
 Wycliffe Bible Translators

1320s births
1384 deaths
14th-century Christian biblical scholars
14th-century English people
14th-century English writers
14th-century Latin writers
14th-century philosophers
Alumni of Merton College, Oxford
Anglican saints
Christian radicals
Christian humanists
Critics of the Catholic Church
English evangelicals
English Reformation
Lollards
Masters of Balliol College, Oxford
People excommunicated by the Catholic Church
People from Buckinghamshire
People from Richmondshire (district)
Posthumous executions
Proto-Protestants
Proto-socialists
Translators of the Bible into English
Translators to English
Wardens of Canterbury College, Oxford